The American Association of Tissue Banks (AATB); a transplant trade organization that is dedicated to ensuring that human tissues intended for transplantation are safe and free of infectious disease, of uniform high quality, and available in quantities sufficient to meet national needs.

The AATB provides accreditation for over 100 tissue banks. According to their website, AATB is a voluntary association of organizations committed to obtaining tissues for allografts (transplant) and providing the general public and the medical community with the safest products possible. The program is not regulatory in nature, but educational.

The AATB also accommodates accreditation to non-transplant tissue banks and whole body donation programs.

To avoid violating the Health Insurance Portability and Accountability Act, AATB must through their legal anatomical authorizations obtain consent which allows AATB representatives access to donor information for accreditation reviews.

See also
Certified Tissue Bank Specialist

References

External links
 Official website

Medical and health organizations based in Virginia